Kanaka is a 2018 Indian Kannada-language romantic action film directed by R. Chandru. It features Duniya Vijay, Hariprriya and Manvitha Harish in the lead roles along with P. Ravishankar, Rangayana Raghu and Sadhu Kokila in key supporting roles. The score and soundtrack for the film are by Naveen Sajju and the cinematography is by Satya Hegde.

The official teaser of the film was released on 1 November 2017 coinciding with the Kannada Rajyotsava festival. The film released on 26 January 2018.

Cast
 Duniya Vijay as Kanaka
 Manvitha Harish as Kanasu
 Hariprriya as Sampige
 P. Ravishankar
 Dr Darshan Basavaraj as Kanaka's brother 
 Sadhu Kokila
 Rangayana Raghu
 Achyuth Kumar
 Srinivasa Murthy
 Sudha
 Yuga Chandru
 Padmaja Rao
 Jaimin Panchal
 Naveen Sajju (special appearance in "Enne Namdu Oota Nimdu")

Soundtrack

The film's background score and the soundtracks are composed by playback singer Naveen Sajju, making his debut in composition. The music rights were acquired by Anand Audio.

References

External links
 
 "Kanaka Movie - Duniya Vijay - Dir: R Chandru - Mdir: Navin Sajju - Releasing on Dec 1st"

2010s Kannada-language films
2010s romantic action films
Indian romantic action films
Films about organised crime in India
Films shot in Mysore
Films directed by R. Chandru